Commerce is a city in Ottawa County, Oklahoma, United States. The population was 2,473 at the 2010 census, down 6.5 percent from the figure of 2,645 in 2000, and lower than the 2,555 residents it had in 1920. Commerce is included in the Joplin, Missouri metropolitan area.

History

What became Commerce was land that was part of the Quapaw Indian Agency, allocated in the late 1830s. The Quapaw were removed to the area in the 1830s by the federal government after residing for hundreds of years on the west side of the Mississippi River in what later entered the union as the state of Arkansas.

Immigrants arrived and formed a mining camp named Hattonville after Amos Hatton. In 1906, Hatton developed the Emma Gordon zinc and lead mine, whose resources had attracted workers. Starting in 1908, the Oklahoma, Kansas and Missouri Inter-Urban Railway built a line between Miami and Commerce to serve the mining industry. In a series of steps the line was later acquired by the St. Louis–San Francisco Railway.  In 1913, the residents called the local post office North Miami, though by June 1914 the post office took the present-day city's name that came from the Commerce Mining and Royalty Company, which had bought the mining camp.

In 1914, the mining company platted the town; a mayor–council government formed two years later. By the 1920 census, Commerce had a population of 2,555.  The town's population has remained roughly the same size ever since.

Commerce was on Route 66 when that highway was commissioned in 1926, and was the first town on the route through Oklahoma after crossing the Kansas border westbound.

Commerce was the site of two notable events in the mid-1930s. In April 1934, Bonnie and Clyde and their associate Henry Methvin killed Commerce Constable William C. Campbell and kidnapped police chief Percy Boyd.  By May, Bonnie and Clyde would both be dead.
In 1935, in an event that would later become notable in retrospect, Mickey Mantle's father would move his family to Commerce, to work as a miner. Mantle would later be nicknamed "The Commerce Comet."

Most mines closed by 1960, due to a declining market and the realization of extensive environmental damage to ground, water and air. Residents have turned to occupations such as farming and ranching,

Geography
Commerce is located at  (36.933529, -94.871371), five miles north of Miami on U.S. Route 69, which was once part of historic U.S. Route 66.

Demographics

As of the census of 2000, there were 2,645 people, 968 households, and 693 families residing in the city. The population density was 3,232.2 people per square mile (1,245.4/km). There were 1,079 housing units at an average density of 1,318.5 per square mile (508.1/km). The racial makeup of the city was 68.05% White, 13.35% Native American, 0.64% African American, 0.19% Asian, 0.11% Pacific Islander, 11.68% from other races, and 5.97% from two or more races. Hispanic or Latino of any race were 18.53% of the population.

There were 968 households, out of which 36.5% had children under the age of 18 living with them, 51.3% were married couples living together, 14.9% had a female householder with no husband present, and 28.4% were non-families. 25.3% of all households were made up of individuals, and 12.3% had someone living alone who was 65 years of age or older. The average household size was 2.65 and the average family size was 3.18.

In the city, the population was spread out, with 29.7% under the age of 18, 10.7% from 18 to 24, 26.0% from 25 to 44, 18.2% from 45 to 64, and 15.4% who were 65 years of age or older. The median age was 32 years. For every 100 females, there were 90.0 males. For every 100 females age 18 and over, there were 84.5 males.

The median income for a household in the city was $25,982, and the median income for a family was $30,547. Males had a median income of $25,104 versus $18,466 for females. The per capita income for the city was $11,734. About 14.7% of families and 16.7% of the population were below the poverty line, including 22.8% of those under age 18 and 13.9% of those age 65 or over.

Notable people 
Commerce has been home to several professional athletes, most notably Mickey Mantle, a Hall of Fame professional baseball player. Others include:
 Orien Crow, professional football player
 Doug Furnas, World Class Powerlifter and professional wrestler
 Bob Seymour, professional football player
 Bo Wininger, professional golfer

Gallery

References

External links

  
 "Commerce", Encyclopedia of Oklahoma History and Culture
 Ottawa County Map

Cities in Ottawa County, Oklahoma
Cities in Oklahoma
Zinc mining in the United States